Panevėžys natural gas compression station is the older of two operating gas compressor stations in Lithuania, located in the City of Panevėžys. The operator is AB Amber Grid. The capacity of the station is 7.7 MW.

History 
Panevėžys natural gas compression station started operations in 1974.

Directions and use 
Panevėžys NGCS was adapted to work in 3 directions:
West Way -  Klaipėda
North Way -  Riga
South Way -  Vilnius

Currently it is mostly used for Klaipėda direction. The station can be adapted for reverse flow operation.

References 

Natural gas compression stations in Lithuania
1974 establishments in Lithuania
Panevėžys